Heterocerus collaris is a species of variegated mud-loving beetle in the family Heteroceridae. It is found in North America.

References

Further reading

 
 
 

Byrrhoidea
Articles created by Qbugbot
Beetles described in 1851